Sir William Conrad Reeves (Saint Joseph, Barbados 1838 – Barbados, 8 January 1902), was a nineteenth century lawyer and academic in Barbados.

Biography
Reeves was born in Barbados, to Thomas Phillipps Reeves and Peggy Phyllis. He represented the Parish of Saint Joseph, within the House of Assembly in Bridgetown. He was patronised, with funds collected by the black community, to stay in the United Kingdom to study at the Middle Temple, which he left in 1863. He subsequently became Attorney general of St Vincent. He was appointed Solicitor-General of Barbados in 1875. He was Attorney General of Barbados from 1882 to 1886. In 1883 he was admitted to the Queen's Counsel.

He became the first black Chief Justice of Barbados in 1886. He served in this position until his death. In 1889, Reeves was knighted by Queen Victoria, and thus became the first black man to be knighted by a British sovereign.

Family
Reeves married, in 1868, Margaret Rudder, who was the daughter of J. T. R. Rudder. They had one daughter.

References
Footnotes

References

External links
 The House of Assembly, Parliament of Barbados

1838 births
1902 deaths
Barbadian lawyers
Barbadian judges
Solicitors General of Barbados
Attorneys-General of the Colony of Barbados
Chief justices of Barbados
Members of the House of Assembly of Barbados
People from Saint Joseph, Barbados
British Windward Islands judges
Colony of Barbados judges
Colony of Barbados people
19th-century Barbadian lawyers
20th-century Barbadian lawyers